Vijay Mehra (born 17 October 1963), is an American former cricketer who played for the United Arab Emirates cricket team. He played six One Day Internationals for United Arab Emirates. He was a wicket-keeper and batsmen. Mehra is the great-nephew of the Delhi cricketer and administrator Ram Prakash.

He attended St. Columba's School, Delhi and St. Stephen's College, Delhi.

During the 1996 LOI World Cup, he was described as the "Sachin Tendulkar of UAE cricket". Indeed, his debut LOI innings was a stroke-filled 43 against an Indian side that featured Tendulkar.

References

External links
 Cricinfo page on Vijay Mehra
 CricketArchive page on Vijay Mehra

1963 births
Living people
American expatriate sportspeople in the United Arab Emirates
Indian expatriate sportspeople in the United Arab Emirates
United Arab Emirates One Day International cricketers
American sportspeople of Indian descent
Cricketers from New York City
St. Columba's School, Delhi alumni
St. Stephen's College, Delhi alumni